Elections to Rossendale Borough Council were held on 7 May 1998.  One third of the council was up for election and the Labour Party stayed in overall control of the council. Overall turnout was 30%.

After the election, the composition of the council was:
Labour 25
Conservative 11

Election result

Ward results

References
"Council poll results", The Guardian 9 May 1998 page 16
Magnificent seven blaze a blue comeback trail
Election results: ROSSENDALE

1998
1998 English local elections
1990s in Lancashire